Vincenzo Capellini Townshend (born 28 October 1963) is an English record producer, mixer, and audio engineer, and has worked with artists and bands including the Rolling Stones, a-ha, Kaiser Chiefs, U2, Snow Patrol, Florence and the Machine, Friendly Fires, Bloc Party, Franz Ferdinand, the Maccabees, Jamie Cullum and Thirty Seconds to Mars. Townshend was awarded 'Mix Engineer of the Year' for two successive years by the Music Producers Guild Awards in 2009 and 2010, and nominated again in 2016, 2017 and 2018.

Early life
He is the only child of Antonio Capellini and Lady Carolyn Townshend, the eldest daughter of George Townshend, 7th Marquess Townshend. After his parents divorced in 1971, his mother remarried to Edgar Bronfman Sr. in 1973, but they separated after only 10 days and the marriage was annulled in 1974.

Townshend was educated at Milton Abbey School in Dorset.

Career
Townshend began his career by working at Trident Studios in London in the late 1980s, eventually working as an assistant engineer for Alan Moulder and Mark 'Spike' Stent. Following this, Townshend worked independently with producer Ian Broudie for 8 years and then joined producer Stephen Street at The Bunker in Olympic Studios in London where he maintained residency until its closure in 2009. 

As of 2012, Townshend mixed from his Decoy Studios in Woodbridge Suffolk.

Selected discography (mixing)

References

External links
 Spotify Playlist
 AllMusic Discography
 Decoy Studios

English audio engineers
English record producers
Mixing engineers
Living people
1963 births
People educated at Milton Abbey School